Theebine is a rural town and locality split between the Gympie Region and the Fraser Coast Region, both in Queensland,  Australia.

Geography 

The western boundary of the locality is the Mary River.

The North Coast railway line passes through the locality from south to north with the Theebine railway station , serving the town. The former Kingaroy railway line (later the Nanango railway line) branched at Theebine with the Dickabram railway station located in Theebine just before the Dickabram Bridge over the Mary River.

Kanyan is a neighbourhood in the north-east of the locality and takes its name from the former Kanyan railway station. Kanyan is derived from the Kabi language word kanigan meaning daughter.

History 
The town was originally established to service the railway junction where the Kingaroy line branched from the North Coast railway line. The Kingaroy to Theebine railway, opened in December 1904, was used for agriculture and commercial freight as well as transporting passengers and was one of the first branch lines built in Queensland. Formerly Kilkivan Junction, it was re-named by the Railways Department as Theebine on 23 May 1910, using a Waka language word, dhil-bvain indicating the lung fish, Ceratodus Forsteri.

The Theebine Hotel was first built in 1909 and was known as the Kilkivan Junction Hotel.

The Kilkivan Junction Provisional School opened in 1889 and became Kilkivan Junction State School on 1 January 1909. In 1910, it was renamed Theebine State School.

A stump-capping ceremony was held for the United Presbyterian and Methodist Church on Saturday 3 February 1940. The church was officially opened on Saturday 4 May 1940. It could seat 112 people. The church was also available for Anglican Church services. In 1977 with the amalgamation that created the Uniting Church in Australia, it became the Theebine Uniting Church. In 2000, it became the Theebine Community Church.

Theebine Masonic Lodge opened in 1948.

The Theebine to Kingaroy line was officially closed in early 2010.

Heritage listings 

Theebine has a number of heritage-listed sites, including:
 Dickabram Bridge, across the Mary River

Education 
Theebine State School is a government primary (Prep-6) school for boys and girls at Scrub Road. In 2015, it had an enrolment of 5 students with 1 teacher and 2 non-teaching staff (1 equivalent full-time). In 2018, the school had an enrolment of 12 students with 2 teachers (1 full-time equivalent) and 4 non-teaching staff (2 full-time equivalent).

There are no secondary schools in Theebine. The nearest government secondary school is James Nash State High School in Gympie to the south.

Amenities 

Theebine Community Church is at 4 Old Cleveland Road.

Theebine Community Hall is adjacent to the church at 6 Old Cleveland Road.

Theebine Masonic Lodge is at 17-19 Theebine Road.

Attractions 
The town is best known for the restored Theebine Hotel, a tourist attraction, at 11 Theebine Road.

See also
 Theebine railway station, Queensland

References

External links

 

Towns in Queensland
Gympie Region
Fraser Coast Region
Localities in Queensland